Patrick Collins may refer to:

 Paddy Collins (1903–1995), Irish sportsman
 Paddy Collins (referee) (born 1942), Irish Gaelic football referee and administrator
 Patrick K. Collins (born 1977), rugby union coach
 Patrick Collins (director), American pornographic film producer and director
 Patrick Collins (footballer) (born 1985), player from England
 Patrick Collins (mayor) (1844–1905), U.S. Representative from Massachusetts and mayor of Boston
 Patrick Collins (painter) (1911–1994), Irish painter
 Patrick Collins (American football) (born 1966), American football player
 Patrick M. Collins (born 1964), American lawyer
 Patrick Collins (hurler) (born 1996), Irish hurler

See also
 Pat Collins (disambiguation)
 Collins (surname)